Prairie Fire was a United States television news magazine focusing on Central Illinois. It was produced by WILL-TV, a public broadcasting station owned by the University of Illinois at Urbana-Champaign. One of the longest-running local TV programs in central Illinois, it last aired in 2010.

References

External links
Official Program website

1990s American television news shows
2000s American reality television series
Local news programming in the United States
1992 American television series debuts
2010s American reality television series
2010 American television series endings
University of Illinois Urbana-Champaign